Marc El-Sayed (born January 18, 1991) is a German professional ice hockey Forward who is currently playing for the EC Bad Nauheim in the DEL2. He had originally played the beginning of his professional career with Adler Mannheim. On April 1, 2014, El-Sayed signed a one-year contract to join the Thomas Sabo Ice Tigers. He remained two years with the Ice Tigers before signing with fellow DEL side Schwenninger Wild Wings in April 2016.

After three seasons with the Wild Wings, El-Sayed left the DEL and returned to his original home junior club, EC Bad Nauheim of the DEL2, on a two-year contract on March 12, 2019.

Career statistics

Regular season and playoffs

International

References

External links

1991 births
Living people
Adler Mannheim players
German ice hockey forwards
People from Wetzlar
Sportspeople from Giessen (region)
Schwenninger Wild Wings players
Thomas Sabo Ice Tigers players